Clostridium cellulovorans is an anaerobic, mesophilic, spore-forming cellulolytic bacterium. Its cells are gram-positive and are non-motile rods which form oblong spores. The type strain is 743B (ATCC 35296). Its role as an object of study is based on the latter notion.

References

Further reading

External links
 
 LPSN
 Type strain of Clostridium cellulovorans at BacDive -  the Bacterial Diversity Metadatabase

Gram-positive bacteria
Bacteria described in 1985
cellulovorans